Daniel Ischdonat (born 9 June 1976) is a German former professional footballer, and the current first team goalkeeping coach at SV Sandhausen.

Playing career
He made his professional league level debut in the 2. Bundesliga for SV Eintracht Trier 05 on 10 August 2002 when he started in a game against SV Wacker Burghausen.

Coaching career
From 2013 to 2017, he worked as goalkeeping coach at SV Sandhausen. In 2017, Ischdonat temporarily replaced the injured Alexander Kunze as goalkeeping coach at Eintracht Braunschweig. He returned to Sandhausen at the beginning of the 2017–18 season.

References

External links
 

1976 births
Living people
German footballers
Association football goalkeepers
Sportspeople from Leverkusen
Footballers from North Rhine-Westphalia
Bayer 04 Leverkusen II players
SV Eintracht Trier 05 players
1. FSV Mainz 05 players
FSV Frankfurt players
SV Sandhausen players
2. Bundesliga players
3. Liga players
Association football goalkeeping coaches
Eintracht Braunschweig non-playing staff